Kandila is a town in the western part of Aetolia-Acarnania, Greece. Kandila was the seat of the former municipality Alyzia. Its population was 1,048 in 2011. It is situated 3 km from the Ionian Sea, in a plain at the western foot of the Acarnanian Mountains. It is 4 km north of Mytikas, 40 km west of Agrinio and 33 km southeast of Preveza. The ruins of ancient Alyzia are located here.

Population

References

V. Liagko, Ένας μικρός τόπος, μια μεγάλη ιστορία = One Small Place, One Huge History.

External links
 Kandila on GTP Travel Pages

See also

List of settlements in Aetolia-Acarnania

Populated places in Aetolia-Acarnania